Elaine Cunningham is a Jamaican former cricketer who played as an all-rounder. She appeared in five One Day Internationals for the West Indies, all at the 1993 World Cup. She played domestic cricket for Jamaica.

References

External links
 
 

Living people
Date of birth missing (living people)
Year of birth missing (living people)
Place of birth missing (living people)
West Indian women cricketers
West Indies women One Day International cricketers
Jamaican women cricketers